László Deseő (26 June 1893 – 25 June 1948) was a Hungarian military officer and diplomat, who served as artillery commander of the Hungarian Second Army's First Corps during the Second World War.

Deseő was captured after the Battle of Stalingrad. He died as a prisoner of war (his number was 8355) in the Soviet Union in 1948 one day before his 55th birthday.

References
 Zempléni Hadtörténelem - Deseő László életrajza

1893 births
1948 deaths
Hungarian soldiers
Hungarian military personnel of World War II
Hungarian prisoners of war
World War II prisoners of war held by the Soviet Union
Prisoners who died in Soviet detention